Cladium mariscus is a species of flowering plant in the sedge family known by the common names swamp sawgrass, great fen-sedge, saw-sedge or sawtooth sedge. Previously it was known as elk sedge. It is native of temperate Europe and Asia where it grows in base-rich boggy areas and lakesides. In the past, it was an important material to build thatched roofs; harvesting it was an arduous task due to its sharp edges that can cause deep lacerations.

Subspecies

C. m. californicum (S.Watson) Govaerts - California, Arizona, New Mexico, Nevada, Utah, Texas, Sonora, Coahuila
C. m. intermedium Kük. - Australia, New Caledonia
C. m. jamaicense (Crantz) Kük. - Latin America from Mexico to Argentina; West Indies; southeastern United States from Texas to Delaware; naturalized in tropical Africa and on many oceanic islands including Canary Islands, Madagascar, New Guinea, Hawaii
C. m. mariscus - Europe, northern Asia and North Africa from Ireland and Morocco to Japan, including Germany, Italy, France, Scandinavia, Poland, Balkans, Ukraine, Russia, Siberia, Saudi Arabia, Iran, Himalayas, Kazakhstan, China, Korea

References

mariscus
Flora of Lebanon
Plants described in 1753
Taxa named by Carl Linnaeus